The Frank was the currency of the Swiss canton of Thurgau between 1798 and 1803. It was subdivided into 10 Batzen, each of 4 Kreuzer. It was worth th the French silver écu or 6.67 g fine silver.

History

The Frank was the currency of the Helvetian Republic from 1798. The Helvetian Republic ceased issuing coins in 1803. Thurgau issued coins between 1808 and 1809. In 1850, the Swiss franc was introduced, with 1 Thurgau Frank = 1.4597 Swiss francs.

But the main currency in the Canton of Thurgau between 1803 and 1850 was the South German Gulden. It was subdivided into 15 Batzen or 60 Kreuzer. In 1850, the Swiss franc was introduced, with 1 Gulden = 2.12 Swiss francs.

Coins

References

External links
 

Modern obsolete currencies
Currencies of Switzerland
1800s establishments in Switzerland
1850 disestablishments in Switzerland